Georges Anglade (July 18, 1944 – January 12, 2010) was a Haitian–Canadian geographer, professor, writer and politician.

Early life and education
Anglade was born in Port-au-Prince. In 1965, he received a law degree and a diploma in Social Sciences from the Faculty of Law from the École normale supérieure in Port-au-Prince. He studied at the University of Strasbourg from 1965 to 1969, where he obtained a degree of literature in 1967 and doctorate of Geography in 1969. He came to Montreal in 1969 and was one of the founders of the Université du Québec à Montréal.

Career
He was head of the UQAM department of geography from 1982 to 1984, served two terms as head of the graduate program, and was a professor of social geography until 2002.

Anglade was a strong opponent of the Duvalier régime in Haiti. He was imprisoned under François Duvalier in 1974.  He was exiled from Haiti in 1974 and 1991. He spent much of his adult life in exile in Quebec. In the 1980s, he founded the Haitian Solidarity Movement (MAS) in Montreal and in 1990 he published La Chance qui passe, a manifesto calling for democracy in Haiti. In 1994, he chaired the Miami International Political Conference, which initiated the return to democracy in Haiti. In the mid 1990s, he served as advisor under the governments of Jean Bertrand Aristide and René Préval. He served as the Minister of Public Works of Haiti for 10 months in 1995. 

Anglade was active member of PEN International. He served on the board of PEN Quebec for 11 years. He founded the PEN Centre Haiti, and served as president until his death in 2010. His vision was realized in 2012, with the opening of the Maison Georges Anglade PEN Centre located in Thomassin, Haiti.

Death
Anglade was killed alongside his wife, Mireille Neptune Anglade (also Haitian), a women’s rights activist, in the 2010 Haiti earthquake. They were at the home of prominent economist Phillipe Rouzier and his wife Marilyse, when the house collapsed. Rouzier was also killed. Mireille and George Anglade's house, located in the same ancestral domain in Port-au-Prince, also collapsed.

Family
His daughter Dominique Anglade was a member of the National Assembly of Quebec and was deputy premier of the province from October 2017 to October 2018. She became the leader of the Quebec Liberal Party and leader of the Official Opposition of Quebec in May 2020, until her retirement from politics in November 2022 following the results of the Quebec 2022 general election.

Bibliography

Fiction

Non-fiction

References

External links
Notice of Georges Anglade's death

1944 births
2010 deaths
Haitian scientists
Haitian politicians
Haitian male novelists
Haitian emigrants to Canada
Academic staff of the Université du Québec à Montréal
Victims of the 2010 Haiti earthquake
Haitian male short story writers
Haitian short story writers
21st-century Haitian novelists
Haitian non-fiction writers
21st-century Canadian male writers
Haitian Quebecers
Male non-fiction writers